Monache High School is one of the three  high schools located in Porterville, California, United States and is part of the Porterville Unified School District (PUSD). It's the city's second high school and as of 2021 serves approximately 2,583 students.

Arts 
There is a large mural of a Native American on the side of the school's gym. This refers to the high school's mascot, the "Marauder." The mural is shown on student handbooks, and on the posters detailing the school's ESLRs. An additional mural faces the tennis courts.

Music 
The Monache High School Marching Band has performed around the world, such as Edinburgh, Scotland, the Aloha Bowl, the Hollywood Christmas Parade, The Rose Parade, The Macy's Thanksgiving Day Parade, The Orange Bowl Parade, and The Fiesta Bowl. The band has won the title of Grand Champions at the Selma Marching Band Festival 27 times. In 2006, the group won the Centennial Band Review and was named Grand Champion of the Chick-Fil-A Bowl Band festival, winning three of the festival's four events: jazz band, field show and parade. They did not compete in the Concert Band competition.

Mathematics 
Current courses include: Prealgebra, Math 2P, Math 3P, Statistics, Trigonometry, Precalculus P and Calculus AB/BC.

Notes

External links 

Public high schools in California
Porterville, California
High schools in Tulare County, California
1967 establishments in California